Mauricio Álvarez de las Asturias Bohorques y Ponce de León, 4th Duke of Gor (4 November 1864 – 24 February 1930) was a Spanish Duke and fencer. He competed in the individual sabre, foil and Épée events at the 1900 Summer Olympics.

He was the 4th Duke of Gor, a peerage Grandee title in Spain.

References

External links
 

1864 births
1930 deaths
Sportspeople from Jerez de la Frontera
Spanish male épée fencers
Olympic fencers of Spain
Fencers at the 1900 Summer Olympics
Dukes of Gor
Spanish male foil fencers
Spanish male sabre fencers